The Lake Church Formation is a geologic formation in Wisconsin. It preserves fossils dating back to the Devonian period.

See also

 List of fossiliferous stratigraphic units in Wisconsin
 Paleontology in Wisconsin

References
 

Devonian geology of Wisconsin
Devonian southern paleotemperate deposits